Rachel Aberlin or Rachel ha-Ashkenaziah (fl. 1582–1609), was a Jewish mystic. She is described in the Sefer ha-Ḥezyonot ("The Book of Visions") by Hayyim Vital. She was an influential figure of the early Sabbateanism and a spiritual leader of women. 

She was married to Judah Aberlin (d. 1582), a leader of the Jewish community of Safed in Jerusalem and Damascus. After the death of her husband, she acted as the patron of religious Jewish leaders and was herself a leading religious figure, known for regularly experiencing mystical visions, from pillars of fire to Elijah the Prophet. She was reportedly "accustomed to seeing visions, demons, souls, and angels," and made prophecies of the future. Her date of death is not recorded but she made an intervention in a case of spirit possession involving a young woman in Damascus in 1609.

See also
Francesa Sarah of Safed

References 
 Emily Taitz, Sondra Henry & Cheryl Tallan,  The JPS Guide to Jewish Women: 600 B.C.E.to 1900 C.E., 2003

   

16th-century Jews from the Ottoman Empire
16th-century religious leaders
Jewish mysticism
17th-century Jews from the Ottoman Empire
17th-century women from the Ottoman Empire
16th-century women from the Ottoman Empire
Sabbateans
Jewish women
Jews in Ottoman Palestine